Margaret Stella Lee (20 June 1923 - 16 October 1987) credited as Margo Lee, was an Australian actor and singer of radio, stage, film and TV.

She worked briefly in Hollywood.

Filmography
Into the Straight (1949)
The Twelve Pound Look (1956) (TV movie)
Stormy Petrel (1960) (TV series)
Don't Listen Ladies (1963) (TV movie)
Flowering Cherry (1963) (TV movie)

References

External links

20th-century Australian actresses
1923 births
1987 deaths
20th-century Australian women singers
Australian expatriates in the United States